The Tower of Portu is a ruined Genoese tower located in the commune of Ota (Corse-du-Sud) on the west coast of the Corsica.

The construction of the Tower of Portu began in around 1551. It was one of a series of coastal defences constructed by the Republic of Genoa between 1530 and 1620 to stem the attacks by Barbary pirates.  The tower was one of the earliest towers built on the west coast of Corsica. The design of the tower is unusual in being square rather than round. It is owned by the department and in 1946 was listed as one of the official historical monuments of France.

See also
List of Genoese towers in Corsica

References

External links
 Includes information on how to reach 90 towers and many photographs.

Towers in Corsica
Monuments historiques of Corsica